Werner Kilcher (13 June 1927 – 1995) was a Swiss equestrian. He competed in two events at the 1952 Summer Olympics.

References

1927 births
1995 deaths
Swiss male equestrians
Olympic equestrians of Switzerland
Equestrians at the 1952 Summer Olympics
Place of birth missing
20th-century Swiss people